The Los Angeles Times Women of the Year Silver Cup was an award presented to almost 300 women between 1950 and 1977 to honor achievements in science, religion, the arts, education and government, community service, entertainment, sports, business, and industry. It was started by Dorothy Chandler in 1950 but cancelled by Otis Chandler in 1977, as he considered women's awards “unnecessary in today’s world.”

Winners
Notable winners include:
Jean Goodwin Ames
Irene Dunne
Lotte Lehmann
Dorothy Marshall
Anaïs Nin
Lily Tomlin
Agness Underwood
Martha Watson

See also
 List of awards honoring women

References

Los Angeles Times
Awards honoring women
American awards
Awards established in 1950
Awards disestablished in 1977